Gildo Rodrigues (30 November 1939 – 17 August 2009) was a Brazilian footballer manager. 

Rodrigues firstly acted as a fitness coach at Madureira between 1967 and 1969. He became a manager in 1974, coaching Portuguesa. In his manager career, he mainly coached football clubs in the Middle East.

Rodrigues died on 17 August 2009, aged 69.

Honours
Al-Salmiya SC 
Kuwaiti Premier League: 1981
Kuwait Emir Cup: 1993

Sampaio Corrêa 
Campeonato Maranhense: 1987

References

1939 births
2009 deaths
Sportspeople from Rio de Janeiro (city)
Brazilian football managers
Brazilian expatriate football managers
Expatriate football managers in Bahrain
Expatriate football managers in Kuwait
Expatriate football managers in Liberia
Expatriate football managers in Saudi Arabia
Expatriate football managers in China
Associação Atlética Portuguesa (RJ) managers
Ghana national football team managers 
São Cristóvão de Futebol e Regatas managers 
Liberia national football team managers 
Sampaio Corrêa Futebol Clube managers
Kuwait national football team managers 
Al-Wehda Club (Mecca) managers 
Guangzhou F.C. managers
FK Vardar managers
Al-Ahli Club Manama managers
Expatriate football managers in North Macedonia
Al-Salmiya SC managers
Kuwait Premier League managers